Zed Saad Aboulos (born 24 May 1997), is a Qatari professional footballer who plays as a midfielder for Qatar Stars League side Al-Shamal.

Career statistics

Club

References

External links
 

1997 births
Living people
Qatari footballers
Association football midfielders
Al-Arabi SC (Qatar) players
Al-Wakrah SC players
Al-Shamal SC players
Qatar Stars League players